ARM Romero (PO-144) is a  offshore patrol vessel of the Mexican Navy.

Naval ships of Mexico